Gianpiero Piovani  (born January 12 June 1968 in Orzinuovi) is an Italian retired footballer and manager of Sassuolo Femminile. He played as a forward.

Career

Career a player

The early years
Piovani's long football career began in the football season of 1985 - 1986, when, although he was still very young, he joined Brescia Calcio and played 13 matches. He then moved to Parma F.C., which had just returned to B under Arrigo Sacchi. He was trained by the famous coach 1 year long and had 30 appearances and shot 4 goals. When the coach went A.C. Milan Piovani returned to Brescia. He was then fetched by coach Claudio Ranieri to Cagliari Calcio, where he helped to promote to Serie B.

Piacenza
11 years Piovani played for Piacenza Calcio. In this period Piacenza achieved its best so far: 12th in Serie A 1997/1998.

International team
Aged 41 Piovani was capped for the first time for the Padania national football team, which hosted the 2009 VIVA World Cup. In his first international match June 22, 2009 he achieved the winning goal.

Career as a manager
After his retirement, in the season 2009-10 he became the manager of Nuova Verolese Calcio.

He in the season 2010-11 became the head coach of A.C. Rodengo Saiano, in place of resigning Paolo Rodolfi, in the Lega Pro Seconda Divisione Group A.

He in the season 2011-12 became the head coach of Darfo Boario until the end of the season.

References

External links

1968 births
Living people
Sportspeople from the Province of Brescia
Italian footballers
Piacenza Calcio 1919 players
A.C. Rodengo Saiano players
A.S.D. Calcio Ivrea players
Association football midfielders
Footballers from Lombardy
Serie A (women's football) managers